Robert L. Stacey (February 17, 1936 – March 4, 2015), better known as Stacey Arceneaux, was an American professional basketball player.

According to professional basketball pundit Charley Rosen, Arceneaux was for a time a standout player in the old Eastern League, now called the Continental Basketball Association (CBA).

He played for the St. Louis Hawks (1961–62) in the NBA for 7 games. He died in 2015.

References

External links 

1936 births
2015 deaths
Basketball players from New York City
Forwards (basketball)
St. Louis Hawks players
Undrafted National Basketball Association players
American men's basketball players